{{Speciesbox
| taxon = Profundiconus kanakinus
| image =Conus kanakinus 1.jpg
| image2 =Conus kanakinus 2.jpg
| image_caption =Apertural and abapertural views of shell of  Profundiconus kanakinus Richard, G., 1983
| authority =(Richard, 1983)
| synonyms_ref =
| synonyms =
 Conus kanakinus Richard, 1983 (original combination)
 Phasmoconus kanakinus (Richard, 1983)
| display_parents = 3
}}Profundiconus kanakinus is a species of sea snail, a marine gastropod mollusk in the family Conidae, the cone snails and their allies.

Like all species within the genus Conus, these snails are predatory and venomous. They are capable of "stinging" humans, therefore live ones should be handled carefully or not at all.

Description
The size of the shell varies between 11 mm and 21 mm.

Distribution
This marine species occurs off New Caledonia.

References

 Richard, G., 1983. Two new species of Conus from New Caledonia: Conus boucheti sp. nov. and Conus kanakinus sp. nov. (Neogastropoda: Conidae). Journal of the Malacological Society of Australia 6(1–2): 53–58
 Tucker J.K. & Tenorio M.J. (2013) Illustrated catalog of the living cone shells''. 517 pp. Wellington, Florida: MdM Publishing.
 Puillandre N., Duda T.F., Meyer C., Olivera B.M. & Bouchet P. (2015). One, four or 100 genera? A new classification of the cone snails. Journal of Molluscan Studies. 81: 1–23

External links
 The Conus Biodiversity website
 Cone Shells – Knights of the Sea
 
 Holotype in MNHN, Paris

kanakinus
Gastropods described in 1983